War Gods may refer to:
 War Gods (video game), a video game for video arcades and for the Nintendo 64, PlayStation and Windows
War-Gods of the Deep, a 1965 film also known as City Under the Sea
War Gods of Babylon, a 1962 Italian film

See also
Gods of War (disambiguation)
List of war deities of ancient mythology